Franklin Hall Williams (October 22, 1917 – May 20, 1990) was an American lawyer and civil rights activist. As an assistant to Thurgood Marshall, he represented the National Association for the Advancement of Colored People before courts in criminal cases throughout the American South. In 1950, he was appointed director of the NAACP's western region, where he directed drives involving open housing, school desegregation and civil rights.

Early life and education
Williams was born in Flushing, Queens. He graduated from Pennsylvania's Lincoln University in 1941, where he was a member of Alpha Phi Alpha fraternity, Nu chapter. In 1945, he earned a law degree from the Fordham University School of Law.

Career
In 1959, Williams became assistant attorney general of California and in 1961, the Kennedy administration appointed him to assist Sargent Shriver in organizing the Peace Corps. As a delegate to UNESCO, he championed establishment of an international counterpart to the Corps.

Under President Johnson, Williams became the first black representative to the United Nations Economic and Social Council and later was appointed ambassador to Ghana. During his three-year tenure at this post, he was

credited with improving the formerly strained relations between the United States and the African nation.

Leaving government service in 1968 Mr. Williams headed the Columbia University Urban Center, issuing the study "Human Uses of the University – Planning a curriculum for Urban and Ethnic Affairs at Columbia University."

For 20 years, Williams was president of the Phelps Stokes Fund, established to facilitate the education of African and Native American students. During this time he served on several boards, among them: Lincoln University, the Council on Foreign Relations, the New York Board of Higher Education, the American Symphony Orchestra, the Barnes Foundation, Consolidated Edison and Borden, Inc.

In 1989 he chaired the New York State Judicial Commission on Minorities. The commission has since continued as the Franklin H. Williams Judicial Commission.

Personal life 
Williams was a member of Alpha Phi Alpha fraternity. Williams was married to Shirley Broyard, a sister of literary critic Anatole Broyard. Williams died on May 20, 1990 at the age of 72.

References

American civil rights lawyers
Fordham University School of Law alumni
1990 deaths
1917 births
20th-century American lawyers
African-American diplomats
Ambassadors of the United States to Ghana
Lincoln University (Pennsylvania) alumni
20th-century African-American people
20th-century American diplomats